The Cathedral of the Immaculate Heart of Mary is the mother church of the Roman Catholic Diocese of Las Cruces in Las Cruces, New Mexico.

The cathedral building, originally a parish church, was begun in September 1965 and finished in May 1966 in a contemporary southwestern style. The church was designated the cathedral of the Diocese of Las Cruces in 1982.

Gallery

See also
List of Catholic cathedrals in the United States
List of cathedrals in the United States

References

External links 

Official Cathedral Site
Roman Catholic Diocese of Las Cruces Official Site
Cathedral parish website

Immaculate Heart of Mary
Roman Catholic churches in New Mexico
Buildings and structures in Las Cruces, New Mexico
Churches in Doña Ana County, New Mexico
Christian organizations established in 1953
Roman Catholic churches completed in 1966
Cathedrals in New Mexico
20th-century Roman Catholic church buildings in the United States